Our Lady of Soufanieh refers to Marian apparitions reported to have occurred in Soufanieh, a suburb of Damascus in Syria starting in 1982.

History 
The apparitions reportedly occurred in December 1982, and January, February and March 1983. A flow of oil from an image of the Virgin Mary (described as miraculous), as well as oozing of oil from the face and hands of Myrna Nazzour, is said by observers to have accompanied the apparitions.

Reporter Brigid Keenan wrote that the oil ostensibly produced by Nazzour has been analyzed as "100 per cent olive oil", and that hundreds of people, including some doctors and psychiatrists, have witnessed Nazzour's secretions and failed to find evidence of trickery. According to her reports, Nazzour developed stigmata wounds in the "forehead, hands, feet and side", and the Virgin appeared to her outside her own home. Nazzour said the Virgin told her that "Christians should pray for peace, love one another and pray for the unity of the Christian churches."

References

Further reading 
Marius Kociejowski The Street Philosopher and the Holy Fool: A Syrian Journey (Sutton Publishing) Stroud 2004, contains a chapter on Myrna Nazzour "Our Lady of Soufanieh".
Zahlaoui, Élias: Soufanieh. - in Sbalchiero, Patrick (ed.)(2002): Dictionnaire des miracles et de l'extraordinaire chrétien. - Paris: Fayard, p. 738-741.
Sbalchiero, Patrick: Damas/ Soufanieh. - in Laurentin, René/ Sbalchiero, Patrick (ed.)(2007): Dictionnaire des "apparitions" de la Vierge Marie. - Paris: Fayard, p. 1093-1097. 
Touw, Johannes M.: Öl-Materialisationen und Stigmen in Soufanieh (Damaskus). - in: Resch, Andreas (1997): Paranormologie und Religion. - Innsbruck: Resch, p. 251-321.
Robert J. Fox (2002): Light from the East – Miracles of Our Lady of Soufanieh.

External links 
 Our Lady of Soufanieh
 Miracle of Damascus

Soufanieh
Eastern Christianity in Syria
Eastern Catholicism in Syria